Kazlų Rūda is an air strip in Lithuania located 5 km northeast of Kazlų Rūda. It was built during the Soviet times for military purposes and officially opened in 1977. It had a secret underground facility that became publicly known only in 1993 when last Soviet soldiers left the compound. Today it is abandoned.

External links
 Photos and articles in Lithuania

Soviet Air Force bases
Lithuanian Air Force bases
Military facilities of the Soviet Union in Lithuania
Buildings and structures in Marijampolė County
Airbase
Military installations established in 1977